The 1989 Georgia Southern Eagles football team represented Georgia Southern College (now known as Georgia Southern University) as an independent during the 1989 NCAA Division I-AA football season. Led by Erk Russell in his eighth and final year as head coach, the Eagles compiled a record of 15–0 and won the NCAA Division I-AA Football Championship, the program's third national title in five seasons. The Eagles played their home games at Paulson Stadium in Statesboro, Georgia.

Schedule

References

External links
 1989 Football Media Guide at gseagles.com

Georgia Southern
Georgia Southern Eagles football seasons
NCAA Division I Football Champions
College football undefeated seasons
Georgia Southern Eagles football